Pedrosa de Río Úrbel is a municipality and town in Burgos Province, Castile and León, Spain. According to the 2004 census (INE), the municipality has a population of 269 inhabitants.

References

Municipalities in the Province of Burgos